The following is a list of cities in the Marshall Islands.  With the exception of Ebeye, all of the urban areas of the Marshall Islands are on the Majuro Atoll.

The population of the islands as a whole is less than 60,000; the population of most of these urban areas is less than 10,000.

Ajeltake
Delap-Uliga-Djarrit
Ebeye
Laura
Rairok

See also 
 Municipalities of the Marshall Islands
 List of cities by country

References 

Marshall Islands, List of cities in the
 
Cities
Marshall